Melittiphisoides is a genus of mites in the family Laelapidae.

Species
 Melittiphisoides apiarium M. Delfinado-Baker, E. W. Baker & C. H. W. Flechtmann, 1984

References

Laelapidae